Clover Records was a United States based record label of the 1920s. According to their labels, Clover Records were manufactured by "The Nutmeg Record Corporation", which was part of the Emerson-Consolidated corporate group.  Much of Clover's output were pressed from masters originally recorded by Emerson Records and Grey Gull Records.  The output consisted primarily of dance music and popular vocals.

See also
 List of record labels

References

External links
Clover Records on the Internet Archive's Great 78 Project

Defunct record labels of the United States